South Ossetia is a region in the South Caucasus that is under the effective control of the self-declared Republic of South Ossetia–the State of Alania but recognized by most of the international community as part of Georgia. The Government of Georgia has established a Provisional Administration of South Ossetia which it considers to be the legal government of South Ossetia. Both entities have adopted a similar flag to represent themselves, a tricolour, top to bottom white, red, and yellow.

Republic of South Ossetia–the State of Alania

The flag of the Republic of South Ossetia–the State of Alania was prescribed by the South Ossetian Constitution of 26 November 1990 and confirmed by the Regulation on the National Flag of 30 March 1992. The flag of North Ossetia-Alania was set in law on 2 October 1991, but in December the middle stripe was changed to purple, and then changed back to red on 24 November 1994.

Provisional Administration of South Ossetia
The Provisional Administration of South Ossetia was established by the Government of Georgia April in 2007. At that time the provisional administration started using a white, red and yellow tricolour together with the flag of Georgia.

Historical flags
Between 1922 and 1990, South Ossetia was an autonomous oblast of the Georgian Soviet Socialist Republic known as the South Ossetian Autonomous Oblast. As an autonomous oblast, it didn't have its own flag, instead the Flag of Georgian SSR was used for official purposes.

See also
Coat of arms of South Ossetia
Flag of the Republic of North Ossetia–Alania, a federal subject of the Russian Federation

References

South Ossetia
Flag